The Canadian Nationalist Party was a far-right, white nationalist political party in Canada. It was registered with Elections Canada from 2019 to 2022.

Policies 
The CNP's stated purpose is "to improve the social and economic conditions of an ethnocentric Canada" by maintaining the demographic majority status of Canadians of European descent, while claiming their policies will benefit all Canadians. The party proposes discontinuing public funding for pride parades, restricting abortion access, establishing a mandatory national curriculum based on "European and Christian values," and repealing the Canadian Multiculturalism Act.

History 
The Canadian Nationalist Party (CNP) was founded on June 1, 2017, by Travis Patron. 

On August 9, 2017, coinciding with the Unite the Right rally in Charlottesville, Virginia, the CNP organized the Toronto Nationalist Rally at the University of Toronto's St. George campus. The event's Facebook page described the rally as an opportunity to "discuss the nationalist movement in Canada," and to protest Canada's immigration policy. A counter-protest was organized in response to the rally, and the University of Toronto denied the party the opportunity to organize on campus grounds.

In November 2017, party leader Travis Patron announced his intent to officially register the CNP as a federal political party and field candidates for the 2019 federal election. On November 26, Patron started a cross-country tour in Toronto. During the tour, the party's meeting at the Belgian Club in Winnipeg, Manitoba, was cancelled following protests. The club's treasurer subsequently resigned, and the organization voluntarily withdrew from Folklorama, the city's multicultural festival. In early September 2018, Patron reached out to People's Party of Canada leader Maxime Bernier "to see if there would be any interest in possibly co-operating with the Canadian Nationalist Party." Bernier declined any further discussions with Patron.

In June 2019, CNP members were among several far-right groups protesting against Pride parades alongside Yellow Vest demonstrators in Hamilton, Ontario, and Pegida in downtown Toronto. Both protests resulted in violence against counter-protesters, with the latter demonstration resulting in a violent altercation between anti-fascist counter-protesters inside the Eaton Centre. The RCMP launched a hate crime investigation against Patron after Ottawa-based human rights lawyer Richard Warman filed a formal criminal complaint about a video Patron uploaded to YouTube warning of a "parasitic tribe" controlling Canadian institutions and calling for their permanent removal from Canada. During the investigation, the RCMP pursued intellectual property violations against the CNP for using RCMP trademarks without permission. On August 23, 2019, the party lost their registered virtual office location in the Toronto Star Building after Telsec revoked their services.

Elections Canada informed the CNP on August 29, 2019, that it was eligible for registration as a federal political party. The CNP was subsequently registered two weeks later on September 15.

Patron ran under the party banner during the 2019 federal election in Souris—Moose Mountain, the electoral district containing his hometown of Redvers in Saskatchewan. The party also fielded candidates in Lac-Saint-Louis and Scarborough—Guildwood. The party did not win any seats and finished last out of 21 parties, garnering only 281 votes.

Shortly after the 2019 election, Patron was charged with aggravated assault, assault causing bodily harm and breach of probation, after attacking two women in Regina, Saskatchewan, who were sent to hospital for their injuries. On August 23, 2022, Patron was sentenced concurrently to 18-months in jail for two counts of assault causing bodily harm; however, because Patron received time served credit for the amount of time he spent in custody, the sentence was considered served.

A complaint was filed with the RCMP against Patron by the Friends of Simon Wiesenthal Center on July 15, 2020. In their complaint they claim that a post on the party's Facebook page constitutes hate speech. The RCMP had investigated the party in 2019 for a similar claim. Patron was arrested by the RCMP and charged with wilful promotion of hate on February 17, 2021, in connection to the complaint.

Gus Stefanis assumed leadership of the party on August 27, 2021.

The CNP was deregistered by Elections Canada on March 31, 2022, due to its failure to maintain an active party membership of at least 250.

On October 20, 2022, Patron was sentenced to one year in jail for willfully promoting hatred against Jewish people and ordered to refrain from posting about them for a year after the sentence ends.

Election results

References

External links 
 

Anti-abortion organizations in Canada
Anti-globalization political parties
Anti-Islam political parties
Ethnocentrism
Far-right politics in Canada
Federal political parties in Canada
Monarchist parties
National conservative parties
Nationalist parties in Canada
Anti-Islam sentiment in Canada
Political parties established in 2017
Right-wing populism in Canada
Right-wing populist parties
Social conservative parties
White nationalism in Canada
White nationalist parties